The Nirmaljhar is a perennial stream in the Ganjam District in the Indian state of Odisha. It is located beside the temple of Lord Vishnu. The Nirmaljhar flows from the Badaghati Mountains in Eastern Ghats. Khallikote princess Smt. Sugyani Devi has currently formed a committee to promote Nirmaljhar as a tourist site.

Geography

No government accommodations are available on the site, however a Panthanivas is near Rambha about 10 km away.

Etymology

According to folklore, the name "Nirmalajhara" is derived from two Odia/ Sanskrit words: "nirmala" means 'pure' and "jhara" represents 'stream.'

Transportation

Nirmaljhar has both road and rail links. On the Northern side, it is 60 km from Berhampur and on the Southern side it is about 120 km from the state Capital Bhubaneswar. Khallikote station is the nearest railway station and is 9 km away from Niramaljhar.

References

Rivers of Odisha
Ganjam district
Eastern Ghats
Rivers of India